Chehalis may refer to:

People
 Chehalis people, a Native American people of Washington state
Lower Chehalis language
Upper Chehalis language
 Sts'Ailes people (Chehalis people), a First Nation in British Columbia
 Chehalis First Nation, British Columbia
 Confederated Tribes of the Chehalis Reservation, Washington

Places
 Chehalis, Washington
 Chehalis, British Columbia

Other
 Chehalis River (Washington)
 Chehalis River (British Columbia)
 Chehalis Western Railroad
 USS Chehalis (AOG-48), a World War II era U.S. Navy gasoline tanker supply ship